Kyaw Khing Win (born 23 December 1983) is a footballer from Myanmar. He made his first appearance for the Myanmar national football team in 2003.

References 

1983 births
Living people
Burmese footballers
Myanmar international footballers
Association football defenders